Patriarch Joseph II may refer to:

 Patriarch Joseph II of Constantinople, Ecumenical Patriarch in 1416–1439
 Joseph II (Chaldean Patriarch) (ruled in 1696–1713)
 Pope Joseph II of Alexandria, Pope of Alexandria & Patriarch of the See of St. Mark in 1946–1956